The Lost River State Forest is a state forest located in Roseau County, Minnesota. The forest borders the Canadian province of Manitoba to the north, and parcels belonging to the Red Lake Indian Reservation are within the forest's boundaries. The forest is managed by the Minnesota Department of Natural Resources.

The forest is known for its excellent birdwatching. Avian species within the forest include the great grey owl, spruce grouse, snowy owl, northern hawk owl, and northern saw-whet owl, whip-poor-will, American three-toed woodpecker, black-backed woodpecker; yellow-bellied flycatcher, common raven, boreal chickadee, and magnolia warbler. Outdoor recreation opportunities in the forest include dispersed camping, hunting and  trails are designated for hiking and snowmobiling.

See also
List of Minnesota state forests

External links
Lost River State Forest - Minnesota Department of Natural Resources (DNR)

References

Minnesota state forests
Protected areas of Roseau County, Minnesota
Protected areas established in 1963